X-Large may refer to:

 X-Large (film) (2011), Egyptian romantic comedy
 X-Large (clothing brand), American streetwear brand